Katelyn Inch (born 19 August 1995) is a New Zealand international lawn bowler.

Bowls career

World Championships
Inch was born in Rangiora and brought up in Oxford, New Zealand. She made her debut for New Zealand in 2015 and won a bronze medal in the fours at the 2016 World Outdoor Bowls Championship in Christchurch with Angela Boyd, Val Smith and Kirsten Edwards.

In 2020 she was selected for the 2020 World Outdoor Bowls Championship in Australia.

Commonwealth Games
She was selected as part of the New Zealand team for the 2018 Commonwealth Games on the Gold Coast in Queensland. In 2022, she competed in the women's singles and the women's pairs at the 2022 Commonwealth Games. In the pairs she secured a bronze medal.

Asia Pacific
Inch has won three medals at the Asia Pacific Bowls Championships, the latest being a gold medal at the 2019 Asia Pacific Bowls Championships in the Gold Coast, Queensland.

Nationals
Inch won the 2019 Australian National Bowls Championships pairs with Julie Keegan and the New Zealand National Bowls Championships singles and pairs in 2020.

References

External links
 
 
 

1995 births
Living people
New Zealand female bowls players
Commonwealth Games competitors for New Zealand
Commonwealth Games bronze medallists for New Zealand
Commonwealth Games medallists in lawn bowls
Bowls players at the 2018 Commonwealth Games
Bowls players at the 2022 Commonwealth Games
People from Rangiora
Sportspeople from Canterbury, New Zealand
Medallists at the 2022 Commonwealth Games